Caroline Atherton Briggs Mason (27 July 1823 – 13 June 1890) was an American poet whose works include Do They Miss Me At Home? and The King's Quest. Many of her poems became popular hymns in the Unitarian church.

Early life
Mason was born in Marblehead, Massachusetts, the daughter of physician Dr. Calvin Briggs and Rebecca Briggs. She was educated at Bradford Academy in Bradford, Massachusetts, and began writing when quite young. In 1852, her family moved to Fitchburg, Massachusetts.

Published works
Her first poems were published in the Salem Register under the name "Caro". Mason was also published in The Congregationalist, The Liberal Christian, The Monthly Religious Magazine, The Independent and The Christian Union. She contributed largely to the hymnology of the Unitarian church, and her poetry generally is strong in the didactic element.

She published a collection of poetry, Utterance: or Private Voices to the Public Heart in 1852 and a Sunday school story, Rose Hamilton in 1859. In 1891, she published Lost Ring and other Poems in 1891.

She contributed largely to the hymnology of the Unitarian church, and her poetry generally is strong in the didactic element.

Major works
One of her early poems, Do They Miss Me at Home? was set to music by S.M. Grannis and published by mid-1852. It obtained immediate and widespread popularity in the United States and in England. Its popularity carried into the Civil War, where Mason's lyrics, written as a homesick girl away from home at school, readily translated to the plight of the soldiers on both sides, and was among the songs soldiers would sing.

Several of Mason's poems were honored, notably "The King's Quest".

Personal life
Mason married Charles Mason, an attorney in Fitchburg, in 1853.

Selected works
Do They Miss Me At Home?
The King's Quest
Utterance: or Private Voices to the Public Heart
Lost Ring and other Poems
I cannot walk in darkness long
0 God. I thank Thee for each sight
The changing years, eternal God

References

Sources

External links
 
 Utterance, or, Private voices to the public heart (1852) (full book on Google Books, Do They Miss Me is the first poem)

1823 births
1890 deaths
19th-century American poets
Poets from Massachusetts
People from Marblehead, Massachusetts
People from Fitchburg, Massachusetts
American women poets
19th-century American women writers